Festival at Farbridge is a 1951 comedy novel by the British writer J.B. Priestley. A small town in the Midlands decides to hold its own event during the Festival of Britain.

References

Bibliography
 Klein, Holger. J.B. Priestley's Fiction. Peter Lang, 2002.

1951 British novels
Novels by J. B. Priestley
British comedy novels
Heinemann (publisher) books